Tease Me may refer to:

 Tease Me (album), by Chaka Demus & Pliers
"Tease Me", the album's title track
 "Tease Me" (3T song)
 "Tease Me" (Sneaky Sound System song)
 "Tease Me", a song by Kesha that was leaked on the Internet